Oldřich II of Rosenberg (13 January 1403 – 28 April 1462) was an important Bohemian nobleman who, after the Battle of Lipany, became a recognized leader of the Catholic lords in Bohemia.

Biography
Oldřich II increased the power of the Rosenberg family after taking advantage of the weakening royal power during the Hussite wars. Oldřich was initially sympathetic for the Hussite movement, a position influenced by his guardian Čeněk of Wartenberg. Sigismund appointed him governor of the Bechyně region and Prácheňsko.

Oldřich II was defeated in the Battle of Tábor and in the  near modern day Malý Bor, and participated in the Battle of Vyšehrad in 1420. He found later military success in the Battle of Lipany in 1434 and saw to the destruction of the remaining Hussite forces at the Battle of Křeč in 1435.

During the 15th century, the Rosenberg State dominated almost the entire area of southern Bohemia. In addition to property gains, Oldřich II forged documents stating the Rosenberg family was to receive special privileges from the monarchy. He counterfeited wax seals and amended original documents. A set of documents, allegedly issued by Charles IV, Holy Roman Emperor in 1360, claimed the indivisibility of the Rosenberg State and the establishment of the title of Governor of the House of Rosenberg. These claims were fully legalized in 1493 after approval by the Bohemian Diet and entry in the land records. They were observed until the extinction of the Rosenberg family on November 6, 1611.

Oldřich II also falsified a legend about the origin of the Rosenbergs from the ancient Roman family Ursini. Together with the Italian Orsini family, they reached a agreement confirming their fictional common origin.

Oldřich II was likely a member of the Order of the Dragon.

References

Further reading

1403 births
1462 deaths
15th-century Bohemian people
Medieval Bohemian nobility
Rosenberg family